Eupithecia pseudoicterata is a moth in the family Geometridae. It is found in Iran and Russia (the Caucasus).

References

Moths described in 1960
pseudoicterata
Moths of the Middle East